The New Mexico Department of Transportation (NMDOT) is a state government organization which oversees transportation in State of New Mexico in the southwestern United States. The agency has four main focuses—transit, rail, aviation and highways. The department is based in the Joe M. Anaya Building in Santa Fe.

NMDOT Districts
The NMDOT is divided into six districts which serve various areas of the state:

NMDOT Park and Ride
Beginning in 2003, the NMDOT began operating intercity bus service in New Mexico and Texas, under the name NMDOT Park and Ride. The system includes eight intercity routes and three local routes in Santa Fe.

See also

References

External links

 
 DWI in New Mexico Awareness website by NMDOT

Department of Transportation
New Mexico Department of Transportation
Department of Transportation